Concordia Lutheran Theological Seminary, founded in 1976, is a seminary of the Lutheran Church–Canada (LCC) affiliated with Brock University in St. Catharines, Ontario. Its primary purpose is to educate students seeking ordination in LCC, but its graduate degree programs are open to laypeople.

Programmes
As a graduate-level affiliated college of Brock University, Concordia offers a four-year Master of Divinity programme and a two-year Master of Theological Studies programme. The Divinity program, which includes one year of vicarage (parish internship) in the third year, is designed for students seeking ordination in LCC but open to others; while the Theological Studies programme is designed for laypeople.

Governance
Concordia Lutheran Theological Seminary is an accredited member of the ATS. As an affiliated college, the seminary is also responsible to Brock University for maintaining academic quality in its degree programs.

See also

Higher education in Ontario

References

External links

 
 ATS profile for Concordia Lutheran Theological Seminary

Brock University
Lutheran seminaries
Seminaries and theological colleges in Canada
1976 establishments in Ontario
Educational institutions established in 1976
Lutheranism in Canada
Lutheran buildings and structures in North America